This is a list of Perth Modernians, the notable alumni of Perth Modern School, an academically-selective co-educational public high school located in Subiaco, an inner city suburb of Perth, Western Australia.

Perth Modern School alumni have received more top Order of Australia honours than the alumni of any other school in Western Australia.

Heads of state

Viceroys
Sir Phillip Bennett, AC – Governor of Tasmania
Sir Paul Hasluck (1909–1993) – 17th Governor-General of Australia
Malcolm McCusker, AC – 31st Governor of Western Australia
Ken Michael, AC – 30th Governor of Western Australia
Sir Albert Wolff (1899–1977) – Lieutenant Governor of Western Australia

Government

Heads of government

Bob Hawke (1929–2019), AC – 23rd Prime Minister of Australia
Alexander Donald Taylor – Deputy Premier of Western Australia & Tonkin Ministry 1971–1974, Western Australia

Executive branch

Cabinet
Kim Edward Beazley (1917–2007) – Minister for Education 1972–1975, Australia
Joe Berinson – Burke Ministry 1983–1986, Dowding Ministry 1986–1990 & Lawrence Ministry 1991–1993, Western Australia
Ron Davies (1926–2011) – Tonkin Ministry 1971–1974 & Burke Ministry 1983–1986, Western Australia
Julian Grill – Burke Ministry 1983–1986 & Dowding Ministry 1986–1990, Western Australia
Sir Paul Hasluck (1905–1993) – Minister for Home Affairs 1951–1963, Minister for Defence 1963–1964, Minister for Foreign Affairs 1964–1969, Australia
Judyth Watson – Lawrence Ministry 1991–1993, Western Australia
Daryl Williams – Attorney-General of Australia 1996–2003, Minister for Justice 1996–1997, Minister for Communications, Information Technology and the Arts 2003–2004, Australia
Ray Young (1938–2001) – Court Ministry 1977–1982, O'Connor Ministry 1982–1983, Western Australia

Other executives

Wilson Tuckey – Second Howard Ministry and Third Howard Ministry, Australia
John Wheeldon (1929–2006) – Australian Senator for Western Australia, Third Whitlam Ministry, Australia

Legislative branch

Adair Macalistar Blain (1894–1983) – Australian Senator for Northern Territory
Richard Cleaver (1917–2006) – MHR, Australia
Howard Olney – MLC, Western Australia
John Stone – Australian Senator for Queensland
Peter Watson – MLA, Western Australia
Laurie Wilkinson (1903–1991) – Australian Senator for Western Australia

Judicial branch

Presiding judges
Alan Barblett (1929–2013) – Deputy Chief Justice of the Family Court of Australia, Acting Justice of the Supreme Court of Western Australia
Kevin Parker – Vice-President of the International Criminal Tribunal, Presiding Judge of the International Criminal Tribunal for the former Yugoslavia Trial Chamber II, Justice of the Supreme Court of Western Australia
Sir Albert Wolff (1899–1977) – Chief Justice of Western Australia

Judges, superior courts
Theodore Bredmeyer – Master of the Supreme Court of Western Australia
 Gordon D'Arcy (1902–1969) – Justice of the Supreme Court of Western Australia
Geoffrey Miller – Justice of the Court of Appeal Western Australia, Justice of the Supreme Court of Western Australia
Roy Neville (1904–1970) –  Justice of the Supreme Court of Western Australia
Howard Olney – Justice of the Federal Court of Australia, Justice of the Supreme Court of WA, Acting Justice of the Supreme Court of the NT
David Tonge (1933–2008) – Justice of the Family Court of Australia

Military

Chiefs of services
Sir Phillip Bennett, AC, DSO, LOM – General, first Chief of the Australian Defence Force
David Leach (1928–2020), AC – Vice-Admiral, Chief of the Royal Australian Navy
Sheila McClemans, OBE (1909–1988) – Chief Officer of the Women's Royal Australian Naval Service
Laurie O'Donnell, AC – Lieutenant General, Chief of the Australian Army

Air, flag, and general officers
Alfred Baxter-Cox (1898–1958) – Brigadier, Australian Army
Ron Grey, DSO – Major General, Australian Army
Charles Lloyd (1899–1956) – Major General, Australian Army, Chief of Staff during the Siege of Tobruk, Chief of Mission for the United Nations Korean Reconstruction Agency 1951–1953
Charles Norman Peters, OBE, (1907–?) – Brigadier, Australian Army
Allan Walters, CBE, AFC (1905–1968) – Air Vice Marshall, Royal Australian Air Force, Head of the Australian Joint Services Staff in Washington DC 1952–1953

Others – military
Stanley Buckingham Cann, MBE, (1915–1991) – Major, Australian Army
William Geoffrey Chandler, MBE, (1908–1994) – Major, Australian Army
John Godsell Foreman, MC, (1904–1945) – Major, Australian Army, posthumously decorated commanding officer in World War II
Charles Edward Green, MBE, (1902–?) – Major, Australian Army, Commander 2/4th POW group in Siam
Ralph Honner, DSO, MC, (1904–1994) – Lieutenant Colonel, Australian Army, distinguished commanding officer in World War II
David Arion Collingwood Jackson, OBE, MC, (1916–?) – Lieutenant-Colonel, Australian Army
Leslie Ernest Le Souef, OBE, MDLRF, (1900–1996) – Lieutenant-Colonel, Australian Army
Charles Edward Maurice Lloyd, CBE, (1899–1956) – Colonel, Australian Army

Public service

Public servants
H.C. "Nugget" Coombs (1906–1997) – first Governor of the Reserve Bank of Australia, Governor & Chairman of Commonwealth Bank of Australia, Chairman of the Council for the Arts and of the Council for Aboriginal Affairs, Hackett Scholar
Ross Garnaut (born 1946) – senior advisor to the Australian Government, appointed by Kevin Rudd to write Garnaut Climate Change Review
Ron Grey – Commissioner of Australian Federal Police
Ken Michael, AC – Chairman of East Perth Redevelopment Authority, Commissioner of Main Roads Western Australia
 Sir Walter Scott, AC (1903–1981)- chairman of the Commonwealth Decimal Currency Committee & Board who implemented decimal currency in Australia in 1966
John Stone – Secretary to the Treasury, Australia
Ralph Slatyer, AC (1929–2012) – first Chief Scientist of Australia

Diplomats
Ron Davies (1926–2011) – Agent-General London
Ross Garnaut – Ambassador to China
Sir Paul Hasluck (1905–1993) – delegate at San Francisco Conference 1945 which founded the United Nations, leading delegate of the Australian mission to the United Nations Security Council 1946
Ralph Honner (1904–1994) – Ambassador to Ireland
Ralph Slatyer, AC (1929–2012) – Ambassador to UNESCO

Politicians
Margaret Battye (1909–1949) – Australian women's rights activist, first female court lawyer in Western Australia
Bob Hawke, AC – President of Australian Council of Trade Unions
Clarrie Isaacs (1948–2003) – Australian Aboriginal activist
Rob Riley (1954–1996) – Australian Aboriginal activist
Jessie Robertson (1909–1976) – State president of the National Council of Women 1956–1959 & 1966–1972, of the Australian-Asian Association (1960–1965), international president of the Pan-Pacific and South East Asia Women's Association 1961–1964; co-founder of Association of Western Australia 1947, the Soroptimist Club of Perth 1958, King Edward Memorial Hospital auxiliary 1958, and of the women's auxiliary of the Country and Democratic League 1957 and was president 1961–1964
Vincent Serventy (1917–2007) – established world first nature conservation day, now Earth Day, Commissioner of Australian Heritage Commission, President of Wildlife Preservation Society of Australia, and founder of WA National Trust, WA Tree Society, WA Gould League of Birdlovers

Others – public service
Sheila McClemans (1909–1988) – first female barrister before the WA Supreme Court, co-founder of the first all-female law firm in WA
Jessie Robertson (1909–1976) – State president of the National Council of Women 1956–1959 & 1966–1972, of the Australian-Asian Association (1960–1965), international president of the Pan-Pacific & South East Asia Women's Association 1961–1964; and president of the women's auxiliary of the Country and Democratic League 1961–1964

Academia and science

Chancellors and Vice-Chancellors
H.C. "Nugget" Coombs (1906–1997) – fourth Chancellor of Australian National University 1968–1975, Hackett Scholar
Ross Garnaut – Vice-Chancellor's Fellow, University of Melbourne
John Hay, AC – Vice-Chancellor and President, University of Queensland, Deakin University; Senior Deputy Vice-Chancellor, Monash University, Hackett Scholar
John de Laeter (1933–2010) – Deputy Vice-Chancellor Research and Development, Curtin University
Marcus Liveris (1931–2011) – Deputy Vice-Chancellor of Health Sciences, Curtin University
Ken Michael, AC – Chancellor, University of Western Australia
Sir Fred Schonell (1900–1969) – Vice-Chancellor, University of Queensland, Hackett Scholar
Sir Walter Scott, AC (1903–1981) – Chancellor of the International Academy of Management
Sir Hector Stewart (1901–1979) — Pro-Chancellor, University of Western Australia, and co-founder of School of Medicine

Chairs
David Black – Professor of History and Politics, Curtin University
Brian De Garis – Professor of History, Murdoch University
John Robert de Laeter (1933–2010) – Professor of Physics, Curtin University
Ross Garnaut – Professor of Economics, Australian National University
John La Nauze (1911–1990) – Professor of History, Australian National University, University of Melbourne; Professor of Australian Studies, Harvard University
Ralph Slatyer, AC (1929–2012) – foundation Professor of Environmental Biology at the Research School of Biological Sciences, Australian National University
Tom Stannage (1944–2012) – Professor of History, Curtin University, University of Western Australia
Eric John Underwood (1905–1980) – Professor of Agriculture, University of Western Australia, Hackett Scholar

Other notable academics and scientists
Dorothea Sandars – Parasitologist 
Patricia Woolley – zoologist, La Trobe University, in 1992 searched and found Julia Creek dunnart, Sminthopsis douglasi, a marsupial species thought to be extinct

Rhodes Scholars
1926: Karl Allen
1927: Keith Leo Cooper
1928: Alfred Smith
1931: John La Nauze
1932: Joe Starke
1933: Arthur Finn
1937: Edward Barr
1938: Harry Ross Anderson 
1939: Edmund Ernest Jarvis
1951: John Stone
1952: John Robert Hall
1953: Bob Hawke
1962: Brian De Garis
1965: Daryl Williams

Art, entertainment and media

Artists 
Peter Bladen (1922–2001) – poet, sketch-writer The Mavis Bramston Show
John Ewers (1904–1978) – writer, With the Sun on My Back, first President of the Fellowship of Australian Writers (WA) 1938–1939 & 1946–1947
Rolf Harris – painter & variety entertainer, commissioned to paint portrait of Queen Elizabeth II, & later convicted of sex offences
John Hepworth (1921–1995) – writer, Nation Review magazine
Katherine Langford – actor
Emma Matthews – lyric soprano, Opera Australia
Leslie Rees (1905–2000) – writer, Digit Dick
Paul Ridge – musician, Drapht
Victor Sangiorgio – pianist
Vincent Serventy (1917–2007) – writer & film maker, Emeritus Fellow of the Australia Council Literature Board 1993
Alan Seymour – playwright and author, The One Day of the Year
Donald Stuart (1913–1983) – playwright and author, President of the Fellowship of Australian Writers
Howard Taylor (1918–2001) – painter & sculptor, commissioned to create sculpture Compass and Perspective at Parliament House Canberra
Johnny Young – entertainer, song writer and TV host

Entertainment and media 
Alan Bateman (1936–2012) – managing director of Seven Network, General Manager of Network Ten
 Irene Greenwood (1898–1992) – radio broadcaster and feminist and peace advocate
Maxwell Newton (1929–1990) – first editor The Australian, editor Australian Financial Review, financial editor New York Post, publisher Melbourne Observer & reprinted Marvel Comics editions in Australia, Hackett Scholar
Jessie Robertson (1909–1976) – 6IX radio programme host, "Aunt Judy"
Malcolm Uren (1900–1973) – Editor-in-Chief, West Australian Newspapers

Business

Sir Garrick Agnew (1930–1987) – founder of Robe River Mine, Chair of Agnew Clough (now Clough Limited)
Len Buckeridge (1936–2014) – founder of Buckeridge Group of Companies (BGC)
Elizabeth Gaines – CEO of Fortescue Metals Group
Ross Garnaut – Chair of Bankwest, Lihir Gold, Primary Industry Bank of Australia
Janet Holmes à Court, AC – Chair of Heytesbury, philanthropist
Kevin Parry (1933–2010) – founder of Parry Corporation
 Sir Walter Scott, AC (1903–1981) – founder of WD Scott, co-founder & Chair of Australian Institute of Management

Sport

Sir Garrick Agnew (1930–1987) – swimming, London Olympics 1948, Helsinki Olympics 1952
Alan Barblett (1929–2013) – hockey, Melbourne Olympics 1956
Caitlin Bassett – Australian Netball Diamonds captain
Brian Falconer – VFL footballer, Hawthorn
Zoe Goss – international cricketer (Australia)
Ern Henfry (1921–2007) – VFL footballer, Carlton premiership captain 1947, Victorian state captain – WA Hall of Champions 1993
Anthony Jones – AFL footballer, Fremantle, Sandover Medal 2007
Betty Judge-Beazley (1921–2015) – athletics world records holder, coach of Shirley Strickland, president of the Australian Women's Amateur Athletics Union
Lawrence O’Donnell – Australian shooting team, NRA Bisley, United Kingdom
Kevin Parry (1933–2010) – America's Cup, Parry's yacht Kookaburra III defeated Alan Bond's Australia IV 5-nil & then lost 4-nil to Dennis Connor's Stars & Stripes 87, Parry was also a WA state baseball player
Tom Stannage (1944–2012) – WAFL footballer & WA state representative
Ray Strauss (1927–2013) – Australian hockey player & first class cricketer
Peter Watson – athletics, Mexico Olympics 1968

See also

 List of schools in the Perth metropolitan area

References

Notes

Further reading

External links
 Perth Modern School website
 Perth Modernian Society website

Lists of people educated in Western Australia by school affiliation